Jensen Ranch may refer to:

Jensen Alvarado Ranch, also called Cornelius Jensen Ranch, park and museum in Riverside County, California, listed on the National Register of Historic Places (NRHP)
Jensen Ranch (Selma, California), a historic ranch
Jensen Ranch (Boulder, Wyoming), listed on the NRHP

See also
Jensen House (disambiguation)